The wedge-snouted skink (Chalcides sepsoides) is a common and widespread species of skink in the family Scincidae. It is found in Egypt, Israel, Jordan, Libya, and the Palestinian territories. Its natural habitats are subtropical or tropical dry shrubland, subtropical or tropical dry lowland grassland, freshwater springs, hot deserts, and sandy shores. S. sepsoides is a viviparous species, and it is nocturnal during the summer and diurnal during the winter.

C. sepsoides is subarenaceous, and it moves very efficiently by "swimming" under the sand. In fact, it is rarely seen about the ground, and a common method of capturing specimens is to dig through sand dunes near the bases of bushes; this is because its main escape tactic is to dive into the sand. Its limbs are greatly reduced as an adaptation to this fossorial movement. As a result, it is often considered to be a sand specialist.

The species is threatened by habitat loss, overgrazing, and commercial collection, although none of these threats are considered to be very serious, and the species population is stable.

References

Further reading 
Werner, Y. "Distribution of the Saharan Sphenops sepsoides (Reptilia: Scincidae) in Israel and Jordan", Herpetologica 24: 238–267, September 1968
Attum, Omar, Perri Eason, and Gary Cobbs. "Morphology, niche segregation, and escape tactics in a sand dune lizard community", Journal of Arid Environments 68:4 564–573, March 2007
Attum, Omar, Perri Eason, Gary Cobbs, and S. B. El Din. "Response of a desert lizard community to habitat degradation: Do ideas about habitat specialists/generalists hold?", Biological Conservation 133 52–62, November 2006

Chalcides
Reptiles described in 1829
Taxa named by Jean Victoire Audouin
Taxonomy articles created by Polbot